It Takes a Man and a Woman is a 2013 Filipino romantic comedy film directed by Cathy Garcia-Molina and written by Carmi Raymundo. It is a sequel to two earlier films A Very Special Love (2008) and You Changed My Life (2009). John Lloyd Cruz and Sarah Geronimo reprise their roles as Miggy Montenegro and Laida Magtalas respectively. The film is set two years after their break-up which occurred in a depicted flashback scene following events (not shown) in the preceding film.

Released in the Philippines on March 30, 2013, It Takes a Man and a Woman was a major commercial success. The film grossed PHP 387 million in domestic sales. It is the 2nd highest-grossing film and the highest-grossing Filipino film released in the Philippines in 2013. During the FAMAS Award in 2014, it received three nominations including Best Actor, Best Actress and Best Editing.

Plot
The film follows the life of Miggy (John Lloyd Cruz) and Laida (Sarah Geronimo) after their break-up which occurred after the events in the second film. Miggy is now in a relationship with Belle (Isabelle Daza), while Laida is now a fiercer woman after living in the United States. They try to co-exist in the same company, while Laida tries to oppose Miggy's business decisions through a series of events which made them realize the real definition of true love.
 
After two years, it is shown that Miggy has lost the trust of the board members since he lost the company's aircraft business, and is in need of Laida's help. Coming back from New York, Laida is now stronger than she was before and seems to have moved on from Miggy. The movie shows flashbacks of how Laida and Miggy's relationship turned around when Laida's father cheated on her mother and flies back to Manila. However, at the same time, Miggy's father receives a heart attack and wants Laida to be with him. Unfortunately, Laida is stuck comforting her mother and is in a delay of attending Miggy's father's funeral. He is comforted by Belle, an old family friend, and later share a kiss. Laida witnesses this, and breaks up with Miggy.

Miggy's life is ruined with the loss of Laida and his father and becomes more stubborn. When Laida comes back to Flippage, she wears different clothing and speaks differently while presenting her presentation. She and Miggy feel awkward towards each other and when trust is brought up, she leaves the conference room. Miggy runs after her. He refuses to say that he needs her but in the end, Laida returns to help. As the days go by, Laida is very distant from her old friends. Even though she denies being jealous, everybody knows how she really feels towards Miggy and Belle's relationship.

After the fight over Laida's decision to present a woman's theme on Bachelor to MET, Zoila and friends present a theme of 'transformation' on Laida. Miggy agrees and the next day, they begin a photoshoot at Laida's home, but something is missing and Zoila fails to see what it is. Laida's father says it's her smile, and 'Laida's smile' is up to her eyes. They try to put Laida's family in front of her, but it doesn't seem to make her smile. Zoila and friends do the rain dance but she laughs and doesn't get the smile they are asking for. They ask Miggy to do the rain dance but Laida just seems to be really upset and calls it a day. That evening, Miggy buys pizza for all and just like the first film he gets a plate, puts a pizza on it and gives it to Laida. She refuses. Later on, Zoila and her friends won't stop till they make Laida happy. They decide to sing Laida and Miggy's favourite song 'Kailan' with Miggy singing his favourite part. However, when Miggy sings, Laida gets teary-eyed so he stops singing. They look into each other's eyes and Miggy sees how unhappy and hurt Laida is. Laida calls it a night.

The next day, Miggy is looking for Laida when she hands him a letter of resignation. He chases her to the elevator and presses a button to keep them stuck in it. Inside, she expresses how she really feels and Miggy blames her for throwing everything away after just one mistake. She argues back, telling him she did not go to Canada just for him, accepted all his flaws and left her mother alone for a little while whilst she went to visit him after the funeral, was late and all he does is throw everything away because she was late. She walks out of the elevator, and Miggy is very upset.

In the next few days, she reads a newspaper article about why they hired her and what Miggy went through. She sees him and they sit down and talk. He explains that he had everything but when his father died, he lost confidence. Then, he lost Laida, which destroyed him, and couldn't cope with everything so he lost the aircraft to the Ortegas. Laida makes a truce and accepts his apology. The next day, they fly to New York and find a hotel to stay in. However, a problem occurs in the hotel and they are forced to sleep in Laida's apartment, and Miggy sleeps on the bedroom floor. Their meeting with MET gets cancelled. Instead, they take a tour of New York. The next day, they're about to share a kiss when someone knocks on the door- Belle. They even show their presentation to MET with Belle and make their way home.

In the next few days, Miggy realizes he still loves Laida and ends his relationship with Belle. In the board meeting, MET decides not to let them publish their magazine in the Philippines. However, they agree on a partnership between MET and Flippage on the condition of Laida going back to New York. At the airport, as Laida walks by, everybody is singing lines of 'Kailan', Miggy and Laida's favourite song. Zoila and her friends are there, so are Miggy's family. Miggy asks Laida's parents for her hand in marriage. Laida's mother says it's up to her to decide. Laida agrees and they are married. The story ends on the couple's honeymoon.

Cast

 John Lloyd Cruz as Miguel "Miggy" Montenegro. The youngest of the Montenegro family. In this film, he is in a relationship with Belle. He is having problems in the family after losing the aircraft and is trying to do everything to gain the trust back of the board members. 
 Sarah Geronimo as Adelaida "Laida" Magtalas. Now a fiercer woman, as she has moved on after her breakup with Miggy. She is an EC in New York and comes back to the Philippines to help Flippage, the company where she first started. There are new changes in the Montenegro company, her friends, her family especially her relationship with Miggy. 
 Isabelle Daza as Belle Laurel. Belle is Miggy's new girlfriend. They hooked up after Miggy came back after looking for Laida in New York. Belle and Miggy had a good relationship until Laida came back from America. It is revealed that she was the reason for the breakup between Miggy and Laida. Also, her and Miggy broke up and she left him but he came back for her. She follows Miggy to New York in Laida's apartment where she breaks the kiss moment between the two.
 Rowell Santiago as Arturo "Art" Montenegro. Art trusts Miggy more now and has got a bigger and fonder relationship with him since their father's death.
 Johnny Revilla as Roger Montenegro
 Bing Pimentel as Alice Montenegro
 Al Tantay as Tomas Magtalas
 Irma Adlawan as Baby Magtalas
 Miles Ocampo as Rose Magtalas
 Andrei Garcia as Lio Magtalas. The little brother, still hoping for his sister and his idol Miggy to rekindle their relationship. 
 Matet de Leon as Zoila
 Joross Gamboa as John Rae
 Gio Alvarez as Vincent
 Guji Lorenzana as Carlo
 Dante Rivero as Luis Montenegro (Special Participation)
 Vangie Labalan as Manang

Music

The theme song of the film is of the same title, It Takes a Man and a Woman, which was originally recorded by American singer Teri DeSario from her first album Pleasure Train. Sarah Geronimo performed the vocals of the song and included it in her tenth studio album Expressions (2013).

Release

Box office
It Takes a Man and a Woman had its general release on March 30, 2013, a Holy Saturday. It reportedly earned PHP 32.6 million (est. $800,000; nominal values) on its opening day and PHP 60,975,425 million ($1,496,829; nominal values) during its first week. The second-week run showed a notable margin as it sold 65.2% higher than its debut week. The film played for seven weeks in domestic theaters and had a total box-office gross of PHP 405M. It is the 2nd highest-grossing film and the highest-grossing Filipino film released in the Philippines in 2013. To date, the film is the 8th highest-grossing Filipino film of all-time.

Critical reception
The film has received mixed reviews from critics. Aaron Hillis of the Village Voice wrote: "The final leg of director Cathy Garcia-Molina's exceptionally broad, partly English-dubbed cockles-warmer of a trilogy outright apes Hollywood rom-com formulas with a personality so affably lobotomized it wouldn't dare frighten delicate tastes".

Philbert Ortiz Dy gave the film 3 out of 5 stars, saying, "There are plenty of sweet moments to be found in It Takes A Man and A Woman, but there’s a lot of bloat to get through[...] It might have done the film good to just take a more subdued approach, trusting in the talents of the two leads to provide the mainstream appeal. That said, the current approach still provides some charm. There’s just a sense that it could have been so much more". 
Likewise, Nestor Torre of the Philippine Daily Inquirer wrote: "To be sure, the film wins thematic points with its emphasis on the importance of forgiveness, of really moving on—so, when the constantly bickering ex-lovers finally face up to their hurts and/or guilt, the heretofore sluggish and unfocused drama finally hits viewers where they live, hurt and love. —Unfortunately, it’s too little, too late to save the film".

In a more positive view, It Takes a Man and a Woman received a grade of A from the Cinema Evaluation Board of the Philippines and a G rating by the Movie and Television Review and Classification Board.

Accolades
The film was earn some nominations and wins from award-giving bodies in the Philippines. These include three FAMAS Award nominations including Best Actor, Best Actress and Best Editing. It had eight nominations from Star Awards for Movies including one win for Isabelle Daza as New Movie Actress of the Year. The film had three nominations and wins from Golden Screen Awards: Best Motion Picture (Musical or Comedy), Best Performance by an Actor in a Leading Role (Musical or Comedy) for John Lloyd Cruz and Best Performance by an Actress in a Leading Role (Musical or Comedy) for Sarah Geronimo. In addition, due to its commercial success, the GMMSF Box-Office Entertainment Awards awarded the Box-Office King and Queen to Cruz and Geronimo; as well as the most popular screenwriter to Carmi Raymundo.

References

External links 

 
 
 

Films directed by Cathy Garcia-Molina
Philippine romantic comedy films
2013 films
2013 romantic comedy films
2010s Tagalog-language films
Star Cinema films
Viva Films films
Philippine sequel films
2010s English-language films